Visa requirements for Burkinabe citizens are administrative entry restrictions by the authorities of other states placed on citizens of the Burkina Faso. As of 2 July 2019, Burkinabe citizens had visa-free or visa on arrival access to 57 countries and territories, ranking the Burkinabe passport 87th in terms of travel freedom  according to the Henley & Partners Passport Index.

Visa requirements map

Visa requirements

Notes

Dependent, Disputed, or Restricted territories
Unrecognized or partially recognized countries

Dependent and autonomous territories

Non-visa restrictions

See also

Visa policy of Burkina Faso
Burkinabe passport

References and Notes
References

Burkina Faso
Foreign relations of Burkina Faso